Archeological Site No. 121-52B is a historic site in the Ambajejus Camps of Maine containing prehistoric Native American artifacts. The site was added to the National Register of Historic Places on October 31, 1995.

References

		
National Register of Historic Places in Piscataquis County, Maine